Almirante Brown was a  heavy cruiser in service with the Argentine Navy. The ship was named in honour of Admiral Guillermo Brown, the Father of the Argentine Navy.

Design and construction
Almirante Brown was built by Odero in Genoa (Italy), laid down 27 November 1927, launched on 11 August 1929, and completed 11 July 1931. Her total displacement was 6,800 tons. The ship was broadly similar to the Italian  but was armed with three twin 7.5-in gun turrets as against four twin 8-inch guns. Another important difference was the repositioning of the boilers, which gave the ship a single funnel. As completed the ship had a short funnel but it was subsequently raised. During the Second World War the ship finally received the catapult which had been included in the original design. The catapult and crane were carried on the centreline between the funnel and mainmast, with two Grumman floatplanes. When built six twin 100-mm anti-aircraft guns were mounted at forecastle deck level but these were later replaced by twin 40-mm Bofors guns.

Almirante Brown was decommissioned on 27 June 1961 and sold for breaking up in Italy in 1962.

See also 
 List of ships of the Argentine Navy

References

Notes

Bibliography 
 David Miller, Illustrated Directory of Warships - from 1860 to the present day. (Salamander Books, London, 2001)
 M. J. Whitley, Cruisers of World War II, An International Encyclopedia (1995) Arms and Armour Press
 Purnell's Illustrated encyclopedia of Modern Weapons and Warfare

Further reading 
 Burzaco, Ricardo. Acorazados y Cruceros de la Armada Argentina. Eugenio B, Buenos Aires, 1997.  (in Spanish)
 Arguindeguy, Pablo. Apuntes sobre los buques de la Armada Argentina (1810-1970). Comando en Jefe de la Armada, Buenos aires, 1972. ISBN n/d  (in Spanish)

 

Veinticinco de Mayo-class cruisers
Ships built in Genoa
1929 ships
World War II cruisers of Argentina
Ships built by OTO Melara